Polyisobutene (polyisobutylene) is a class of organic polymers prepared by polymerization of isobutene. The polymers often have the formula Me3C[CH2CMe2]nX (Me = CH3, X = H, F). They are typically colorless gummy solids.  

Polymerization is typically initiated with a strong Brønsted or Lewis acid. The molecular weight (MW) of the resulting polymer determines the applications. Low MW polyisobutene, a mixture of oligomers with Mns of about 500, is used as plasticizers.  Medium and high MW polyisobutenes, with Mn ≥ 20,000, are components of commercial adhesives.

See also
Butyl rubber
Polybutene

References

Organic polymers